Maqsud Sultan Kangarlu was a Safavid military commander during the reign of king Abbas I (r. 1588–1629), who also served as the governor of Nakhchivan from 1605 to 1630. Maqsud Sultan was a member of the Kangarlu branch of the Turkoman Ustajlu tribe, one of the original Qizilbash tribes that had supplied power to the Safavids since its earliest days. He played an important role in the mass relocation of the empire's Armenian subjects in the early years of the 17th century.

Sources
  
 

Iranian Turkmen people
History of Nakhchivan
Safavid governors
Safavid generals
17th-century deaths
17th-century people of Safavid Iran